Macrocystis is a monospecific genus of kelp (large brown algae). This genus contains the largest of all the phaeophyceae or brown algae.  Macrocystis has pneumatocysts at the base of its blades.  Sporophytes are perennial and the individual may live for up to three years; stipes/fronds within a whole individual undergo senescence, where each frond may persist for approximately 100 days. The genus is found widely in subtropical, temperate, and sub-Antarctic oceans of the Southern Hemisphere (e.g. Chile, New Zealand, Australia, Falkland Islands, Auckland Islands, etc.) and in the northeast Pacific from Baja California to Sitka, Alaska. Macrocystis is often a major component of temperate kelp forests.

Description
Macrocystis is a monospecific genus, the sole species is M. pyrifera. Some individuals are so huge that the thallus may grow to up to 60 m (200 ft). The stipes arise from a holdfast and branch three or four times from near the base. Blades develop at irregular intervals along the stipe. M. pyrifera grows to over 45 m (150 ft) long. The stipes are unbranched and each blade has a gas bladder at its base.

Life cycle
The macroscopic sporophyte has many specialized blades growing near the holdfast. These blades bear various sori containing sporangia, which release haploid spores, which will grow into microscopic female and male gametophytes.  These gametophytes, after reaching the appropriate substrata, grow mitotically to eventually produce gametes.

Females release their eggs (oogonia) along with a pheromone, the lamoxirene.  This compound triggers sperm release by males. The Macrocystis sperm consists of biflagellate non-synthetic antherozoids, which find their way to the oogonia following the lamoxirene. The egg is then fertilized to form the zygote, which, through mitosis, begins growth.

Growth
Juvenile giant kelp grow directly on the parent female gametophyte, extending one or two primary blades, and beginning a rudimentary holdfast, which will eventually cover the gametophyte completely.  Growth occurs with lengthening of the stipe, and splitting of the blades.  This occurs by means of small tears where the blade meets the stipe, which splits the stipe into two.  Pneumatocysts grow after the first few blade splittings.

Ecology

Macrocystis typically grow forming extensive beds, large "floating canopies", on rocky substrata between the low intertidal. It was harvested by barges which used large blades to harvest up to 300 tons a day along the coast of California.

Species
Initially, 17 species were described within the genus Macrocystis. In 1874, Hooker, following blade morphology, put them all under the same taxon, Macrocystis pyrifera. In modern times, the large number of species were re-classified based on the holdfast morphology, which distinguished three species (M. angustifolia, M. integrifolia, and M. pyrifera) and on blade morphology, which added a fourth species (M. laevis) in 1986. In 2009 and 2010, however, two studies that used both morphological and molecular assessments demonstrate that Macrocystis is monospecific (as M. pyrifera), which is currently accepted by the phycological community (see AlgaeBase).

Morphs 
Although Macrocystis is a monospecific genus, some split it into the four morphs, or sub-species, described below, following pre-2010 taxonomy:

 Macrocystis pyrifera, known as giant kelp, most widely distributed Macrocystis species, found in intermediate-to-deep water of North America (Alaska to California), South America, South Africa, New Zealand, and southern Australia.
 Macrocystis integrifolia, typically found on intertidal rocks or shallow subtidal rocks of British Columbia, Mexico, Peru and Northern Chile.
 Macrocystis laevis, a smaller, intertidal species, is found on the Pacific coast of North America (British Columbia to California) and South America.
 Macrocystis angustifolia Bory, known as southern giant kelp, is found in shallow waters of South Africa and South Australia.

Distribution
Macrocystis is distributed along the eastern Pacific coast from Alaska to Mexico and from Peru and along the Argentinian coast as well as in Australia, New Zealand, South Africa and most sub-Antarctic islands to 60°S.

References

Further reading
 Lopez, James. "Macrocystis pyrifera." Monterey Bay Aquarium Research Institute. 2001. Monterey Bay Aquarium Research Institute. 10 Jan 2007
M.H. Graham, J.A. Vásquez and A.H. Buschmann (2007) Global ecology of the giant kelp Macrocystis: From ecotypes to ecosystems. Oceanography and Marine Biology: An Annual Review 45: 39-88.

External links
 Macrocystis pyrifa
 Macrocystis integrifolia
 Bushing, William W (2000) Giant Bladder Kelp . Retrieved 21 September 2008.

Laminariaceae
Flora of the Pacific
Marine biota of North America
Flora of California
Flora of the West Coast of the United States
Laminariales genera